Victoria Pavlovich (born 8 May 1978) is a Belarusian table tennis player. Her highest career ITTF ranking was 11.

References

1978 births
Living people
Belarusian female table tennis players